Bayer 04 Leverkusen, also known as Bayer Leverkusen, Leverkusen, or simply known as Bayer, is a German women's football club based in Cologne, North Rhine-Westphalia. The club plays in the Frauen-Bundesliga, the top tier of German women's football.

History

The origin of Bayer Leverkusen women's football section lies at the SSG 09 Bergisch Gladbach, which in the 1970s and 1980s was the dominating club in German women's football. In that period Bergisch Gladbach won the national women's football championship nine times which today is still the record. They also won the DFB-Pokal three times. After the inception of the Bundesliga in 1990 their performance declined through the 1990s, eventually leading to relegation.

In 1996 the women's team moved from SSG 09 Bergisch Gladbach to TuS Köln rrh. At Köln the team played mostly second-tier football with a few seasons in the third tier in between. Their greatest success was a semi-final appearance in the 2007–08 cup. However the team was not able to find sponsors, that would help to realize the team's ambitions of playing Bundesliga football again. Contemporaneously Bayer Leverkusen pronounced their interest to establish a women's football section of their own. On 25 June 2008 the women's football department of TuS Köln rrh. disbanded to join Bayer Leverkusen.

In their first season at Bayer Leverkusen the team finished 7th in the south group of the 2. Bundesliga. The following season Leverkusen became champions of the 2. Bundesliga and would thus play in the Bundesliga in the 2010–11 season. In its debut season the team finished 8th.

The following season the team finished 11th in the table, yet wasn't relegated as Hamburger SV announced its disestablishment of the women's section. Since the 2012–13 season, Leverkusen had been coached by Thomas Obliers, until his resignation in 2017. Leverkusen were relegated back to the 2. Bundesliga soon after.

Players

First-team squad

Former players

Seasons

Stadia

Kurt-Rieß-Anlage (2008–2011)
Ulrich-Haberland-Stadion (Amateurstadion) (2011–2016)
Nachwuchsleistungszentrum Kurtekotten (2016–)

References

External links

Football clubs in North Rhine-Westphalia
Women
Women's football clubs in Germany
2008 establishments in Germany
Association football clubs established in 2008
Frauen-Bundesliga clubs